Jordan "Jelly" Walker (born August 11, 1999) is an American college basketball player for the UAB Blazers (University of Alabama at Birmingham) of the Conference USA (C-USA). He previously played for the Seton Hall Pirates and the Tulane Green Wave.

High school career
Walker grew up in Port Washington, New York.  He began his high school career at Long Island Lutheran High School. Dissatisfied with the lack of playing time there, he transferred to The Patrick School after his sophomore year. Walker averaged 9.7 points per game for the Celics as a junior. As a senior, he averaged 11.9 points and 4.8 assists per game, leading the team to a 29–4 record and earning First Team All-State honors from NJHoops.com. Walker posted a 31-point, seven-assist performance against Linden High School and helped The Patrick School win the Tournament of Champions. 

Walker considered doing a postgraduate season at Montverde Academy, but ultimately remained in the Class of 2017. He committed to playing college basketball for Seton Hall, choosing the Pirates over California, Pittsburgh and UMass.

College career
At Seton Hall, Walker missed several weeks with torn ligaments in his hand as a freshman and averaged 1.8 points per game. Following the season, he transfered to Tulane. 

After sitting out a transfer season, Walker averaged eight points, 2.2 rebounds and two assists per game as a redshirt sophomore. As a redshirt junior, he averaged 13 points, 4.3 assists and 1.7 steals per game. 

Following the 2020-21 season, Walker transferred to UAB. On February 5, 2022, he scored a UAB program record 42 points in a 97–75 victory over Middle Tennessee State. Walker was named Conference USA Player of the Year as well as Newcomer of the Year. He is the second UAB player to earn Conference USA Player of the Year honors, alongside Aaron Johnson, in 2011. On April 11, 2022, Walker declared for the 2022 NBA draft, while maintaining his college eligibility. On May 12, 2022, Walker withdrew his name from NBA draft consideration.  He returned to UAB for the 2022-23 season.

Career statistics

College

|-
| style="text-align:left;"| 2017–18
| style="text-align:left;"| Seton Hall
| 17 || 0 || 7.2 || .323 || .316 || .417 || .5 || .9 || .4 || .1 || 1.8
|-
| style="text-align:left;"| 2018–19
| style="text-align:left;"| Tulane
| style="text-align:center;" colspan="11"|  Redshirt
|-
| style="text-align:left;"| 2019–20
| style="text-align:left;"| Tulane
| 30 || 22 || 25.9 || .405 || .375 || .740 || 2.2 || 2.0 || 1.7 || .0 || 8.0
|-
| style="text-align:left;"| 2020–21
| style="text-align:left;"| Tulane
| 23 || 23 || 33.5 || .398 || .326 || .826 || 2.0 || 4.3 || 1.7 || .0 || 13.0
|-
| style="text-align:left;"| 2021–22
| style="text-align:left;"| UAB
| 34 || 34 || 31.8 || .400 || .396 || .88 || 2.8 || 4.9 || 1.5 || .0 || 20.3
|- class="sortbottom"
| style="text-align:center;" colspan="2"| Career
| 104 || 79 || 26.4 || .398 || .376 || .822 || 2.1 || 3.3 || 1.4 || .0 || 12.1

Personal life
Walker earned the nickname "Jelly" after he joined the Jelly Fam collective, a basketball movement founded by Isaiah Washington centered on finger roll layups.

References

External links
UAB Blazers bio
Tulane Green Wave bio
Seton Hall Pirates bio

1999 births
Living people
American men's basketball players
Basketball players from New York (state)
People from Port Washington, New York
Point guards
Seton Hall Pirates men's basketball players
Sportspeople from Nassau County, New York
The Patrick School alumni
Tulane Green Wave men's basketball players
UAB Blazers men's basketball players